Administrative counties were a unit of local government created by an Act of the Parliament of the United Kingdom for use in Ireland in 1899.  Following the separation of the Irish Free State from the United Kingdom of Great Britain and Ireland, administrative counties continued in use in the two parts of the island of Ireland under their respective sovereign jurisdictions. They continued in use until 1973 in Northern Ireland and until 2002 in the Republic of Ireland.

History

The administrative counties were created by the Local Government (Ireland) Act 1898.  The Act established a new system of local government in Ireland, consisting of county councils, similar to the systems created for England and Wales by the Local Government Act 1888 and for Scotland by the Local Government (Scotland) Act 1889.

As in England and Wales, the Act created county boroughs of Ireland's largest towns which were independent of their surrounding county councils, but in contrast to England, the county boroughs were deemed to be administrative counties themselves.  Thus there were 38 administrative counties, of which 8 were county boroughs.  After the separation of the Irish Free State, eight administrative counties remained in Northern Ireland (including two county boroughs), while the Irish Free State had 30 administrative counties (including four county boroughs).

The administrative counties of Northern Ireland were abandoned as local government areas by the Local Government Act (Northern Ireland) 1972. The Act came into effect in 1973.

Galway city become a county borough in 1986. In 1994 the administrative county of Dublin was abolished and its area was divided into three parts for the purposes of local government: Dún Laoghaire–Rathdown, Fingal and South Dublin.

In the Republic of Ireland, the 1898 Act was replaced by the Local Government Act 2001, which came into operation on 1 January 2002.  The Act adopted the simple title county in place of administrative county.

Former administrative counties of Northern Ireland

The administrative counties in the area now constituting Northern Ireland were created as follows:

County boroughs

Former administrative counties of the Republic of Ireland

The administrative counties in the area now constituting the Republic of Ireland were created as follows:

County boroughs

County and county borough boundaries

The Act placed a number of townlands in a different administrative county from their parent county, following a policy to keep each urban sanitary districts and poor law union within a single administrative county.

The boundaries of the counties and county boroughs, which came into effect on 18 April 1899, were defined by orders of the Local Government Board for Ireland.

See also
 Administrative counties of England
 Administrative counties of Wales
 Counties of Ireland
 Local government in Northern Ireland
 Local government in the Republic of Ireland

References

Local government in the Republic of Ireland
Local government in the United Kingdom